A microapartment, also known as a microflat, is a one-room, self-contained living space, usually purpose built, designed to accommodate a sitting space, sleeping space, bathroom and kitchenette with 14–32 square metres (150–350 sq ft). Unlike a traditional studio flat, residents may also have access to a communal kitchen, communal bathroom/shower, patio and roof garden. The microapartments are often designed for futons, or with pull-down beds, folding desks and tables, and extra-small or hidden appliances. They differ from bedsits, the traditional British bed-sitting room, in that they are self-contained, with their own bathroom, toilet, and kitchenette.

Microapartments are becoming popular in urban centres in Europe, Japan, Hong Kong and North America, maximizing profits for developers and landlords and providing relatively low-priced accommodation. In Rome, where the average price of property in 2010 was $7,800 per square metre ($725 per square foot), microapartments as small as 4 square metres (45 square feet) have been advertised. In 2018, newly built one-room rentals in San Francisco at the Starcity development, aimed at high-income tenants, were referred to as single room occupancy rooms "by another name".

Countries

Hong Kong
Gary Chang, an architect in Hong Kong, has designed a large 32-square-metre (344 sq ft) microapartment with sliding walls attached to tracks on the ceiling. By moving the walls around, and using built-in folding furniture and worktops, he can convert the space into 24 different rooms, including a kitchen, library, laundry room, dining room, bar and video-game room.

In Hong Kong, developers are embracing the micro-living trend, renting microapartments at sky-high prices. The Wall Street Journal compares the 180-square-feet flat in High Place, Sai Ying Pun to the size of a U.S. parking spot (160 square feet) in a video, highlighting the soaring property prices in Hong Kong (one of the apartments in High Place was sold for more than US$500,000 in June 2015).

United States
In the United States, most cities have zoning codes that set the minimum size for a housing unit (often 400 square feet) as well as the number of non-related persons who can live together in one unit.

Common's Williamsburg in Brooklyn rents single rooms where tenants share a kitchen for $2,050 per month; The Guardian states that "[s]ingle room occupancy housing is obviously not a new concept, however, the genius of late capitalism is that it has made it desirable" to high-income renters".

In 2017, California passed a law that encourages development of "efficiency units" of at least 150 sq ft by disallowing localities from limiting their numbers near public universities and public transportation.

In San Francisco, Starcity is converting unused parking garages, commercial spaces and offices into single room residential units, where tenants (tech professionals are the typical renter) get a furnished bedroom and access to wifi, janitor services and common kitchens and lounges for $1,400 to $2,400 per month, an approach that has been called "dorm living for grown ups".

Boston's first microapartment building opened in August 2016, on Commonwealth Avenue in Packard's Corner. As the largest microapartment building in the United States, the building is currently being leased by Boston University to house 341 students during the renovation of another university residence. The building contains 180 units that each contain a bathroom with stand-up shower; a kitchen with all stainless-steel appliances that include an oven, a microwave, a dishwasher, and a refrigerator. Each unit also includes a stand up washer-dryer unit. Other amenities include an optional parking garage and indoor bike room in the basement, currently unused retail space, a lounge space, a rooftop penthouse, a deck overlooking the Allston neighbors, and an entertainment room that will be converted to a fitness center at the end of the University's tenure at the property, which is anticipated to be in 2018.

Indianapolis micro-units are becoming popular as a way to get a downtown rental location. Tiny apartments began as a coastal city trend but they are spreading to the Midwestern United States.

There has been a backlash in some cities against the increasing number of microapartments. In Seattle, some residents have complained that high-density microhousing changes the character of neighborhoods, suddenly increasing demand for parking spaces and other amenities. From 2009 to 2014, Seattle had a big increase in the building and creation of new single room occupancy (SRO) units designed to be rented at market rates, which had an average monthly rent of $660; In 2013, for example, 1,800 SRO units and microapartment units were built. In 2018, the media depicted the increasing popularity of micro apartments as a new trend; however, an article about Seattle in Market Urbanism Report states this is a "reenactment of the way U.S. cities have long worked", as individuals seeking "solo living and centralized locations" are willing to accept smaller apartments even though the per-square-foot prices may be higher than some larger units. The report states that 2018-era micro apartments were known as SROs in the early 20th century, and they housed "rich and poor alike" (although the rich lived in live-in luxury hotels and the poor lived in "bunkhouses for day laborers"). Neighborhood groups in Seattle have criticized new micro apartment SRO units, arguing that they "harmed community character and provided...inhumane living conditions"; the city passed regulations that outlawed micro apartment/SRO construction.

United Kingdom
In the UK, property developers are using office-to-residential permitted development rights, a policy introduced in 2013, to transform old office buildings into microapartment developments. The nationally described space standard stipulates that new homes in the UK cannot be smaller than 37sqm; however, this does not apply to conversions. London-based developer Inspired Homes has taken advantage of office-to-residential permitted development rights to deliver over 400 microapartments. A micro-property in the UK has no strict definition but typically refers to properties with a floor area below 37sqm. Which? magazine reported that almost 8,000 new micro-homes were built in 2016, the highest number on record.

As of 2017, the largest microapartment building in the world is The Collective Old Oak, which opened in London on May 1, 2016. Designed by PLP Architecture, the development has 546 rooms with most units grouped into "twodios" – two en-suite bedrooms that share a small kitchenette. There are also some private suites. Each floor features one larger kitchen with a dining table, which is shared between 30 and 70 residents, and themed communal living spaces such as a games room, a cinema, a 'disco-launderette', a hidden garden and a spa. A restaurant, gym and co-working spaces are located in the lower floors of the building.

Pros and cons
Although some prefer to live in microapartments, others only temporarily live in microapartments due to economic reasons, and would move to a larger house or apartment if they could afford to do so.  Susan Saegert, a professor of environmental psychology at the CUNY Graduate Center was quoted with her opinion on microapartments, “I’ve studied children in crowded apartments and low-income housing a lot,” Saegert said, “and they can end up becoming withdrawn, and have trouble studying and concentrating.” The small size of a microapartment can be an issue with some tenants, as its confined nature may permit strong odors to linger.

See also

 Bedsit
 Capsule hotel
 List of house types
 Minimalist architecture and space
 One-room mansion
 Pied-à-terre
 Single room occupancy

Notes

Further reading
 
 
 
 
 

Apartment types
House types
Housing in the United Kingdom
Housing
Urban design
Urban planning
Affordable housing
Living arrangements